Charles Hughes Terrot FRSE (19 September 1790 – 2 April 1872) was a Scottish Episcopalian minister, theologian and mathematician. He served as Primus of the Scottish Episcopal Church from 1857 to 1862.

Life

Charles Terrot was born on 19 September 1790 at Cuddalore in southern India, the son of Captain Elias Terrot of the Indian Army who was killed at the siege of Bangalore a few weeks after Charles' birth. His mother, Mary Fonteneau, returned to England soon after, and raised Charles in Berwick-upon-Tweed.

He was educated at Carlisle Grammar School and Trinity College, Cambridge, where he graduated BA in 1812. He became a Fellow of Trinity in 1813.

In 1813 he served as a Deacon in Bristol before moving to Chester as a priest. He returned to Scotland in 1814 to serve as an Incumbent in Haddington. In 1833 he served in St Pauls in Edinburgh leading to his rise to Dean in 1837 and Bishop in 1841. During this time he lived at 19 Northumberland Street in Edinburgh's New Town.

He was elected a Fellow of the Royal Society of Edinburgh in 1840, his proposer being James David Forbes, and served as their vice president from 1844 to 1860. He was also a member of the Architectural Society of Scotland.

From 1856 until 1872 he was assisted in his role as Bishop by his chaplain Charles Richard Teape; Thomas Baker Morrell was his coadjutor-bishop from 1863 until 1869, shortly after Terrot's retirement.

He died at home at 9 Carlton Street in Edinburgh on 2 April 1872 and is buried in New Calton Burial Ground with his daughter.

His second wife died before him and is buried separately in Warriston Cemetery.

Family

He married twice, firstly in 1815 to Sarah Ingram Wood (d.1855), secondly, and briefly, in 1859 to Charlotte Madden (d.1862). He had a daughter, Sarah Terrot (d.1901) by his first marriage.

Publications
The Epistle of Paul to the Romans (1828)
Principles of Biblical Interpretation (1832)

References

External links

Bibliographical directory from Project Canterbury

1790 births
1872 deaths
19th-century Scottish people
Fellows of the Royal Society of Edinburgh
Scottish Calvinist and Reformed theologians
Scottish Episcopal theologians
Scottish mathematicians
Primuses of the Scottish Episcopal Church
Burials at the New Calton Burial Ground
People from Tamil Nadu
People educated at Carlisle Grammar School
Alumni of Trinity College, Cambridge
British Christian creationists
Christian Old Earth creationists